Teodorówka  is a village in the administrative district of Gmina Frampol, within Biłgoraj County, Lublin Voivodeship, in eastern Poland.

The village has a population of 589.

In Teodorówka is located the deepest well (150 m) in Gmina Frampol.

References

Villages in Biłgoraj County